Kelly Padrick is an American singer, songwriter, and actress. She is originally from Rhode Island and is now based in New York City.

Padrick's first song was written at the age of five.  She eventually moved to New York City in order to further her career after performing in coffee shops around Rhode Island and New England.

Several of Padrick's songs have appeared in shows such as Desperate Housewives, MTV's Big Tips Texas, HBO's VICE and in Fox Searchlight's movie Trust the Man.

All eleven of Padrick's videos were directed by filmmaker Patricia Chica.

Discography
 Haze (2005)
 Carmine Street (2007)
 Hello My Love (2010)
 Soulmate (2011)
 Dear Love (2014)
 The Brooklyn Hours (EP, 2009)
 The Kind of Girl (EP, 2013)
 Radiance (EP, 2014)
 It's Only Me (2016)
 On the Line (2016)
 Fires (2018)

References

External links
 Official Website
 
 The Making of Tangled Forest

Living people
Year of birth missing (living people)
Place of birth missing (living people)
American women singers
Songwriters from Rhode Island
American actresses
21st-century American women